Oak Hills Country Club is a private golf club in the southern United States, located in San Antonio, Texas. Northwest of downtown, it was founded  in 1921 as the "Alamo Country Club."
Designed by renowned architect A.W. Tillinghast, the golf course opened for member play in 1922. Closed during the Great Depression, it reopened in 1946 as Oak Hills Country Club.

Oak Hills has hosted a number of PGA Tour events. The inaugural Tour Championship in 1987 at Oak Hills was won by Tom Watson with a dramatic birdie on the 72nd hole; the 6-iron used for the approach shot hangs in the pro shop.

Oak Hills has had several touring pros as members and boasts one of the best golfing memberships in the country with it being typical for 30 or more members being scratch or better at any given time.

Its golf course is known as an architectural gem and, as such, was a beloved stop for both PGA and Champions Tour players.  It was consistently ranked as the #1 course in the San Antonio area for many years with its small greens and notoriously deep Tillinghast bunkers. Many players have publicly lamented the departure of professional golf from this venue.

References

External links

Sports venues in San Antonio
Golf clubs and courses in Texas